Jonas Johansson may refer to:

Jonas Johansson (ice hockey, born 1982), Swedish ice hockey defenceman
Jonas Johansson (ice hockey, born 1984), Swedish ice hockey forward
Jonas Johansson (ice hockey, born 1995), Swedish ice hockey goaltender